Marcelina Lech (born 20 November 1996 in Warszawa, Poland) is a figure skater who represented Poland in ladies single skate as a young girl and then turned to pair skating, where she skated for Poland with Jakub Tyc and for Spain with Aritz Maestu .

Competitive highlights
CS: Challenger Series; JGP: Junior Grand Prix

with Maestu, for Spain

with Tyc, for Poland

single skating for Poland

External links

References

Polish female pair skaters
Polish female single skaters
Spanish female pair skaters
1996 births
Living people
Sportspeople from Toruń